Olga Zhanibekova (born July 15, 1986, in Aktyubinsk, Kazakh SSR) is a female freestyle wrestler from Kazakhstan who participated in Women's freestyle wrestling 72 kg at 2008 Summer Olympics. She lost in the 1/8 of final with Rosângela Conceição from Brazil.

External links
 

Living people
1986 births
Wrestlers at the 2008 Summer Olympics
Olympic wrestlers of Kazakhstan
Kazakhstani female sport wrestlers
People from Aktobe
21st-century Kazakhstani women